The Gabon women's national under-16 basketball team is a national basketball team of Gabon, administered by the Fédération Gabonaise de Basket-Ball.
It represents the country in women's international under-16 (under age 16) basketball competitions.

See also
Gabon women's national basketball team
Gabon men's national under-16 basketball team

References

External links
Archived records of Gabon team participations

under
Women's national under-16 basketball teams